The Argentata dell'Etna is an indigenous breed of domestic goat from the area of Mount Etna in the province of Catania and the Monti Peloritani in the province of Messina, in the Mediterranean island of Sicily, in southern Italy. It is raised mainly in that area, but also in the provinces of Enna and Palermo. It is named for the volcano and for its silvery grey coat. The origins of the breed are unknown; it shows similarities to the Garganica breed, and to other Italian grey breeds such as the Ciociara Grigia of Lazio and the Cilentana Grigia of Campania. 

The Argentata dell'Etna is one of the forty-three autochthonous Italian goat breeds of limited distribution for which a herdbook is kept by the Associazione Nazionale della Pastorizia, the Italian national association of sheep- and goat-breeders. The herdbook was established in 2002.

Use

The average milk yield of the Argentata dell'Etna is  litres in 150 days for primiparous,  litres in 210 days for secondiparous and  litres in 210 days for pluriparous nannies; it may reach . The milk averages 4.5% fat and 3.6% protein, and is used to make ricotta, both fresh and al forno, and Padduni cheese, which has PAT status. 

Kids are slaughtered at the age of about one month.

References

Goat breeds
Dairy goat breeds
Goat breeds originating in Italy